Maharajganj is a town and municipal board in Maharajganj district in the Indian state of Uttar Pradesh.

Demographics
As of the 2001 Census of India, Mahrajganj had a population of 26,272. Males constitute 53% of the population and females 47%. Mahrajganj has an average literacy rate of 56%, lower than the national average of 59.5%: male literacy is 67%, and female literacy is 45%. In Mahrajganj, 18% of the population is under 6 years of age.

Places of interest
The Sohagi Barwa Wildlife Sanctuary is located in Maharajganj district of eastern Uttar Pradesh and is part of one of WWF-India’s priority tiger landscapes, the Terai Arc Landscape. The sanctuary is home to a diverse variety of flora and fauna including tigers. A part of the Sanctuary is contiguous with the Valmiki Tiger Reserve of Bihar.

Earlier, to help the staff of the Sanctuary undertake regular patrols and control wildlife crime, WWF-India, in partnership with Aircel Ltd. had donated a Bolero Camper vehicle.

Later, on request of Divisional Forest Officer (DFO), Sohagibarwa Wildlife Division, Uttar Pradesh, WWF-India organized a two-day training from 13–14 June 2012 for the frontline staff of the division. Dr. Rakesh Kumar Singh, Senior Coordinator, Capacity Building, WWF-India, undertook the training in which a total of 70 frontline staff attended. Apart from the frontline staff, all the three Sub-divisional forest officers (SDOs) and the Divisional Forest Officer (DFO) also attended the training.

References

Maharajganj district